The Georges Aillères French Cup is a French rugby league tournament. It is the league cup competition for Elite 2 teams.

History

Early years
Originally called Challenge Georges-Aillères, it started as an invitational preseason tournament hosted by Toulouse XIII Broncos at their home venue Stade Philippe-Struxiano. It was named after retired player Georges Aillères, who played most of his career for Toulouse area rugby league and rugby union clubs.
The original format was a single-day round robin consisting of abridged 30-minute games. Toulouse's two main teams, the home side Broncos (Elite 2) and the Olympique (Elite 1), were mainstays while the two remaining spots were filled on a year-to-year basis. The Broncos won the 2012 edition, the earliest on record, losing to fellow Elite 2 members Lescure d'Albigeois, but beating both Elite 1 participants Toulouse Olympique and Limoux.

Hiatus
In 2015, tournament hosts Toulouse Broncos were absorbed by the Toulouse Olympique organization and the event went dormant.
Instead, the preseason featured a "Friendship Trophy" game between Toulouse's newly merged team and Albi, with the proceeds going to Albi product and Toulouse Olympique player Yoann Didone, who had recently suffered grave injuries in a road accident.

Relaunch
In 2016, the French Rugby League Federation took over the tournament's name and relaunched it under an entirely different format. The new version serves as a secondary cup competition open to all Elite 2 teams, using full-length games and a more spread-out schedule akin to other league cups. In 2019, the tournament was renamed Coupe de France Georges-Aillères, as part of a general strategy by the federation to brand its various cup competitions "Coupe de France", regardless of their level.

In the French rugby league pyramid
The Georges Aillères Cup is one of three minor French Cups offered for competition by the national federation, together with the Paul Dejean Cup for National Division clubs, and the Albert Falcou Cup for Federal Division clubs.
The country's major cup tournament is the Lord Derby Cup, which is open to clubs from all divisions but typically dominated by Elite 1 teams.

Past winners

See also

Rugby league in France
French rugby league system

References

External links

Rugby league competitions in France